Khayan (also Romanized as Khāyān and Khāyūn) is a village in Shirvan Rural District, in the Central District of Borujerd County, Lorestan Province, Iran. At the 2006 census, its population was 2,096, in 579 families.

References 

Towns and villages in Borujerd County